Patrick Boyle (born 17 January 1976) is a fund manager, academic, and author.  Boyle is the Founder of Palomar Capital Management, a UK-based family office. He is a professor of finance at King’s Business School King's College London, and a visiting professor of finance at Queen Mary University of London in the School of Economics and Finance.

Boyle also runs a YouTube channel, where he covers topics related to finance.

Early life and education
Boyle was born in Boston, Massachusetts and raised in Dublin, Ireland. He received a First Class BSc in business from Trinity College Dublin in 2000, and an MSc in finance from the London Business School in 2005. Patrick’s research interests are in investment management, quantitative finance, behavioural finance and market anomalies.

Business career
In 2000, Boyle started his career in private banking at Bank of America.

Early on in his career, Boyle emphasized a statistical approach to finance. Around the time he entered private banking, market data became much more accessible. "[E]ven if I hadn't lived through the various periods, I could at least be a history student of the market."

In 2001, he left Bank of America and began working for Victor Niederhoffer as a financial derivatives trader. Niederhoffer is a former partner of George Soros. Boyle received this opportunity because he began corresponding with Niederhoffer after reading about and admiring his statistical approaches to markets.

He worked for Niederhoffer until 2004. After leaving, he worked at several organizations, including the Royal Bank of Scotland Group, Millennium Management, LLC, and Nomura Securities.

In 2011, Boyle and his business partner Jesse McDougall founded a hedge fund called Palomar Capital Management. The fund counts as investors such people as Stanley Fink, Larry Hite, and Victor Niederhoffer.

Academic career
Since 2009, Boyle has been a Visiting Professor of Finance at the Queen Mary University of London.

In 2017, Boyle became a Professor of Finance at King's Business School, King's College London. In 2019, he won a King's Education Award for Innovation in Teaching. Boyle is one of the organizers of the annual King’s Business School, Conference on Financial Markets.

Boyle has co-authored three finance textbooks. 
 
 
 

Trading and Pricing Financial Derivatives was named as the best options trading book in 2021 by a UK financial education website.

Boyle teaches the Financial Derivatives, Portfolio Management, Asset Pricing and Finance Analytics Classes to master's students in finance.

YouTube & Podcast
Boyle started a YouTube channel in 2019, first uploading educational videos on financial derivatives; these videos were originally intended for use in his courses. He soon began producing content for broader audiences. In January 2021 he started a Podcast called Patrick Boyle on Finance 

In March 2021, he was awarded the Silver YouTube Creator Award for surpassing 100,000 subscribers. In 2022 the Patrick Boyle on Finance Podcast was listed as one of the best Corporate University Podcasts of the year by Player FM

References

1979 births
Living people
People from Massachusetts
People from Boston
Alumni of London Business School
Alumni of Trinity College Dublin
British hedge fund managers
Stock and commodity market managers
American hedge fund managers
Academics of King's College London
Academics of Queen Mary University of London
British textbook writers
American textbook writers
Irish scholars and academics